Robert Fine (1945 – 9 June 2018) was a British sociologist. He was a leading European scholar on the history of social and political thought, cosmopolitan social theory, the social theory of Karl Marx and Hannah Arendt, the Holocaust and contemporary antisemitism, crimes against humanity and human rights. He was a Professor Emeritus at Warwick University. He died on 9 June 2018.

In 1996, he won a landmark case against a student who was stalking him, the first time anyone had won damages for being stalked and the first civil action in which a judge had defined stalking. The case was the topic of his memoir Being Stalked (1997), described by The Daily Telegraph as candid and troubling.

Publications

Books
 Antisemitism and the Left: On the Return of the Jewish Question (with Philip Spencer, Manchester UP 2017) 
 Cosmopolitanism (Routledge Key Ideas 2007)
 Democracy and the Rule of Law: Marx's Critique of the Legal Form (Blackburn Press 2002; Pluto 1984 and 1985)
 Political Investigations: Hegel, Marx, Arendt (Routledge 2001)
 Being Stalked: A Memoir (Chatto and Windus, 1997)
 Beyond Apartheid: Labour and Liberation in South Africa (with Dennis Davis, Pluto 1990)
Edited collections include: Social Theory after the Holocaust (with Charles Turner, Liverpool University Press 2000); People, Nation and State (with Edward Mortimer, IB Tauris 1999); Civil Society: Democratic Perspectives (with Shirin M. Rai, Frank Cass 1997); Policing the Miners' Strike (with Robert Millar, Lawrence and Wishart, Cobden Press 1985); Capitalism and the Rule of Law (with Richard Kinsey, John Lea and Jock Young, Hutchinson).

Articles
 Prof Robert D Fine(2010) 'Dehumanising the dehumanisers: reversal in human rights discourse?' Journal of Global Ethics 6 (2), 179 - 190 (1744-9626) 
 Fine, R.(2010) 'Political argument and the legitimacy of international law' in Legality and legitimacy: normative and sociological approaches, Editors: Thornhill, C. and Ashenden, S. (9783832953546), Baden-Baden: Nomos
 Fine R (2009) 'Cosmopolitanism and Human Rights: Radicalism in a Global Age' Metaphilosophy 40 (1), 8 - 23 
 Prof Robert D Fine(2009) 'Fighting with Phantoms: A Contribution to the Debate on Anti-semitism in Europe' Patterns Of Prejudice 43 (5), 459 - 479 (0031-322X) 
 Fine, R.(2009) 'An unfinished project: Marx's critique of Hegel's philosophy of right' in Karl Marx and Contemporary Philosophy, 105 - 120, Editors: Chitty, A. and McIvor, M. (9780230222373), Basingstoke ; New York: Palgrave MacMillan
Complete list of publications.

External links
Staff page at University of Warwick
Personal home page at Warwick
Interview with Robert Fine on cosmopolitanism, FEHE.org
 Harriet Swain "Escape from a Baleful Gaze" Times Higher Educational Supplement - interview on what it is like to be stalked by a student and how writing about it has helped him cope
 Robert Fine’s talk to the UCU meeting "Legacy of Hope: Anti-Semitism, the Holocaust and Resistance Yesterday and Today." 2010
 Articles in Guardian's Comment is Free
 Book Review: The Definition of Anti-Semitism - Fathom Journal

References

1945 births
2018 deaths
Academics of the University of Warwick
British sociologists
Scholars of antisemitism